The 1989 NHL Entry Draft was the 27th NHL Entry Draft. It was held on June 17 at the Met Center in Bloomington, Minnesota. The Detroit Red Wings' 1989 draft has been noted as exceptionally successful, with 5,955 total NHL games played by the players selected.

The last active player in the NHL from this draft class was Nicklas Lidstrom, who retired after the 2011–12 season.

Selections by round
Below are listed the selections in the 1989 NHL Entry Draft. Club teams are located in North America unless otherwise noted.

Round one

Round two

 The New York Rangers' second-round pick went to the Philadelphia Flyers as the result of a trade on December 18, 1986 that sent Bob Froese to the Rangers in exchange for Kjell Samuelsson and this pick.
 The Washington Capitals' second-round pick went to the New York Rangers as the result of a trade on January 1, 1987 that sent Bob Crawford,  Kelly Miller and Mike Ridley to Washington in exchange for  Bobby Carpenter and this pick.

Round three

 The Toronto Maple Leafs' third-round pick went to the New York Rangers as the result of a trade on March 5, 1987 that sent  Mark Osborne to Toronto in exchange for  Jeff Jackson and this pick.
 The New York Rangers' third-round pick went to the Minnesota North Stars as the result of a trade on October 11, 1988 that sent Brian Lawton, Igor Liba and the rights to Rick Bennett to the Rangers in exchange for Paul Jerrard, Mark Tinordi, the rights to  Mike Sullivan, the rights to Bret Barnett and this pick.
 The Rangers previously acquired this pick as the result of a trade with the Los Angeles Kings on March 10, 1987 that sent that sent  Bobby Carpenter and Tom Laidlaw to Los Angeles in exchange for Jeff Crossman, Marcel Dionne and this pick.

Round four

 The Quebec Nordiques' fourth-round pick went to the Winnipeg Jet as the result of a trade on January 5, 1987 that sent Bill Derlago to Quebec in exchange for this pick.

Round five

Round six

Round seven

Round eight

Round nine

Round ten

Round eleven

Round twelve

Draftees based on nationality

See also
 1989 NHL Supplemental Draft
 1989–90 NHL season
 List of NHL players

References

External links
 1989 NHL Entry Draft player stats at The Internet Hockey Database

Draft
National Hockey League Entry Draft
NHL Entry Draft